Bert Barnes may refer to:

Bert Barnes (footballer) (1890–1964), Australian rules footballer
Bert Barnes, character in The Good Terrorist, a political novel
Bert Barnes, character in "Six Hands Across a Table", an episode of The Avengers

See also
Albert Barnes (disambiguation)
Robert Barnes (disambiguation)
Herbert Barnes (disambiguation)